Sandesar is a village and union council (an administrative subdivision) of Mansehra District in the Khyber Pakhtunkhwa Province of Pakistan. It is located in the south of the district and lies to the west of the district capital Mansehra.

References

Union councils of Mansehra District
Populated places in Mansehra District